The Central District of Sarakhs County is a district (bakhsh) in Sarakhs County, Razavi Khorasan Province, Iran. At the 2006 census, its population was 69,404, in 15,867 families.  The District has one city: Sarakhs.  The District has three rural districts (dehestan): Khangiran Rural District, Sarakhs Rural District, and Tajan Rural District.

References 

Districts of Razavi Khorasan Province
Sarakhs County